Doris Wanjala-Wefwafwa (24 December 1966 – 11 December 2007) was a Kenyan female volleyball player. She was part of the Kenya women's national volleyball team. She competed with the national team at the 2000 Summer Olympics in Sydney, Australia, finishing 11th. She was also part of the national squad at the 1994 FIVB Volleyball Women's World Championship and 1998 FIVB Volleyball Women's World Championship.

See also
 Kenya at the 2000 Summer Olympics

References

External links
 
 Doris Wanjala's obituary

1966 births
2007 deaths
Kenyan women's volleyball players
Place of birth missing
Volleyball players at the 2000 Summer Olympics
Olympic volleyball players of Kenya